Brandeis Award may refer to:

 Brandeis Award (privacy)
 Brandeis Award (Zionism)
 Brandeis Award (litigation), from Federal Trade Commission